Ian Lowe (born 23 February 1973) is a Canadian athlete. He competed in the men's long jump at the 2000 Summer Olympics.

References

External links
 

1973 births
Living people
Athletes (track and field) at the 2000 Summer Olympics
Canadian male long jumpers
Olympic track and field athletes of Canada
Black Canadian track and field athletes
Sportspeople from Bridgetown
Barbadian emigrants to Canada